Eastern Drift is a 2010 Lithuanian crime film directed by Šarūnas Bartas, starring Bartas and Klavdiya Korshunova. Its Lithuanian title is Eurazijos aborigenas and its French title is Indigène d'Eurasie, which means "Eurasian native". It tells the story of a drug smuggler who wants to quit, but is betrayed and tries to flee, together with his prostitute ex-girlfriend, from Moscow to France through Belarus and Lithuania. The film premiered in the Forum section of the 60th Berlin International Film Festival.

Cast
 Šarūnas Bartas as Gena
 Klavdiya Korshunova as Sasha
 Erwan Ribard as Philippe
 Elisa Sednaoui as Gabrielle
 Aurélien Vernhes-Lermusiaux as Aurélien

Reception
Neil Young wrote in The Hollywood Reporter: "The fact that Bartas -- no oil-painting -- has co-devised a scenario where he's lusted after by two gorgeous babes may strike many as narcissistic. Ditto his decision to give himself numerous close-ups and to show off his wiry physique in a nude scene that allows contemplation of his trim buttocks. ... Taken as a whole, however, there is something quietly persuasive and cumulatively engaging about Eastern Drift, not least the way it depicts a Europe that seems to have become progressively 'Russified' since the early 1990s. Bartas finds grey, bleak corners of every city he comes across, often with ironically inappropriate terms like 'Eldorado' and 'Shangri-La' spelled out in Cyrillic neon on building fronts." Variety's Leslie Felperin wrote: "With the nicely shot but messily assembled thriller Eastern Drift, a French-Lithuanian-Russian co-prod, Lithuanian helmer-writer-lenser-thesp Sharunas Bartas further demonstrates, after Seven Invisible Men, that he should stick to camera operating. ... Dire editing, Bartas’ inability to shoot action, act himself or direct thesps all create a tedious excursion."

References

External links
 Eastern Drift at the production company's website 

2010 crime films
2010 films
Films directed by Šarūnas Bartas
Films set in France
Films set in Moscow
Lithuanian drama films
2010s French-language films